Rauschelesee is a lake in Keutschacher Seental near Lake Keutschach in the town Keutschach, Carinthia, Austria. The lake is used for fishing and swimming.

References 

Lakes of Carinthia (state)